Minnow is the common name for a number of species of small freshwater fish, belonging to several genera of the families Cyprinidae and Leuciscidae. They are also known in Ireland as pinkeens. 

Smaller fish in the subfamily Leusciscidae are considered by anglers to be "true" minnows.

Types of minnows

Bluntnose minnow (Pimephales notatus): The bluntnose minnow is a primary bait fish for Northern America, and has a very high tolerance for variable water qualities, which helps its distribution throughout many regions. The snout of the bluntnose minnow overhangs the mouth, giving it the bluntnose. There is a dark lateral line which stretches from the opercle to the base of the tail, where a large black spot is located. The average size of the adult is approximately 5 cm (2 in). 'PimephalesCommon shiner (Notropis cornutus): These fish are one of the most common type of bait fish and are almost exclusively stream dwellers. The common shiner can be identified by the nine rays on its anal fin and terminal mouth. This minnow is typically bluish silver on the sides and greenish blue on the back., save for breeding season in which case the male gains a rose colored tail and anal fin. The shiner grows about 5–10 cm (2–4 in) within one year and reach a size of 13 cm (5 in) at adulthood. Another common "shiner" bait fish is the young version of the European chub (Leuciscus cephalus or Squalius cephaloides) which is quite easy to catch. Notropis potteri is known as the chub shiner.

Common emerald shiner (Notropis atherinoides atherinoides): Common shiners are most abundant in the Great Lakes of North America, primarily Lake Erie. The name of the emerald shiner comes from the greenish emerald band that expands from the back of the gill cover to the tail. This type of minnow has a short, rounded snout, the only difference between the common emerald shiner and the silver shiner is that the silver shiner has a longer snout and a larger eye. These fish grow to an average length of about 6 cm. This is one of the most common bait fish used in the Lake Erie region of Ohio and many fisherman hold it over all other bait.
 Cheat minnow, a species in the genus Pararhinichthys Cutlips minnow, a species in the genus Exoglossum Desert minnows, fishes in the genus Dionda Eurasian minnows, fishes in the genus Phoxinus Fathead minnow (rosy-red minnow), a species in the genus Pimephales Loach minnow, a species of the genus Rhinichthys Short levered minnow, a species of the genus Minnellinus Pikeminnows, fishes in the genus Ptychocheilus Pugnose minnow, a species in the genus Opsopoeodus Silverjaw minnow, a species in the genus Notropis Longjaw minnow, a species in the genus Ericymba Silvery minnows, fishes in the genus Hybognathus Suckermouth minnows, fishes in the genus Phenacobius Vietnamese cardinal minnow, a species in the genus Tanichthys White Cloud Mountain minnow, a species in the genus TanichthysOther fish specifically called minnows include 
 in the Southern Hemisphere, some fish in the family Galaxiidae, in particular those of genus Galaxias in Southeast Asia, the danionins
 the Drakensberg minnow (Labeobarbus aspius) from the Congo Democratic Republic
 the Maluti minnow (Pseudobarbus quathlambae) from Lesotho
 the Falklands minnow  from the Falkland Islands, a vernacular name for the Common galaxias
 the pike topminnow (Belonesox belizanus) are confused for the northern pike, (Esox lucius), also called "minnow" for the little size.

As food
While primarily used for bait, minnows can also be eaten directly by humans. Some Native American cultures have used minnows as food.  If minnows are small enough, they can be eaten whole.

Threats and conservation issues 
Generally, minnows breed with the slightest rainfall and within a wide temperature range. Contrary to the long-standing presumptions, climate change poses 'negligible' threat to minnows' reproduction. Minnows are also flexible in attaining pre-spawning fitness, which makes them avoid 'skipped spawning' decisions while facing climatic variabilities.

See also
 Mud minnow (disambiguation)
 Rosy-red minnow
 Cape Fear shiner

References

External links

Fish common names
Minnows